Laughing Soul is an album by American saxophonist George Braith, his first effort for Prestige after a two-year stint with Blue Note Records. The album was recorded in 1966 and issued the same year as PRLP 7474.

Track listing
All compositions by George Braith except as indicated.

"Hot Sauce" - 3:45
"Chop Sticks" - 2:51
"Chunky Cheeks" (Dixon) - 4:39
"Crenshaw West" - 5:16
"Please Let Me Do It" - 3:06
"Coolodge" - 3:20
"With Malice Toward None" (McIntosh) - 5:20
"Little Flame" - 4:07
"Cantelope Woman" - 4:04

Personnel
George Braith - soprano and tenor saxophone
"Big" John Patton - organ
Grant Green - guitar
Eddie Diehl - rhythm guitar
Victor Sproles Jr. - bass
Ben Dixon - drums
Richard Landrum - congas

References

Prestige Records albums
1966 albums
George Braith albums
Albums recorded at Van Gelder Studio
Albums produced by Cal Lampley